"Panther Power" is a song by Tupac Shakur featuring Ray Luv, and it is one of the earliest recordings by Tupac. The song was produced by the Digital Underground and Strictly Dope member Chopmaster J. The song was posthumously released on the album Tupac: Resurrection and Beginnings: The Lost Tapes 1988–1991. The song is a tribute to the Black Panther Party and his mother, Afeni Shakur, when she was a member of the Black Panther Party. The song deals with slavery, Black nationalism and racism.

References

1988 songs
Tupac Shakur songs
Songs written by Tupac Shakur